Franco Anelli (Piacenza, 26 June 1963) is an Italian academic and rector.

Biography
He has been a Professor of private law since 1993. He graduated in law at Università Cattolica del Sacro Cuore. After a PhD in commercial law, he became an associate professor of institutions of private law at the Faculty of Economics and Business. He has dealt mainly with the law of obligations and contracts and property rights of the family. He also updates the Torrente-Schlesinger Manual of Private Law  published by Giuffrè. He was appointed the rector of Università Cattolica in December 2012.

References

Living people
Università Cattolica del Sacro Cuore alumni
Academic staff of the Università Cattolica del Sacro Cuore
1972 births